Bayombong, officially the Municipality of Bayombong,  is a 1st class municipality and capital of the province of Nueva Vizcaya, Philippines. According to the 2020 census, it has a population of 67,714 people.

Bayombong is the seat of the Provincial Capitol of Nueva Vizcaya. The name Bayombong emanated from the Gaddang word “Bayongyong” which means the confluence of two or more rivers. It has been reported that a certain tribe arrived and tried to invade the place, which caused the outbreak of the first tribal war in the area. The site was renamed “Bayumbung” as a sign of the Gaddangs' first victory in fighting for their private domains.

Etymology
The Gaddang phrase "Bayongyong," which denotes the confluence of two prominent rivers, is where the name Bayombong originated. According to a different interpretation, "bayongyong" refers to a bamboo pole approximately 2 meters long that is used to transport fresh water from wells constructed along riverbanks. When Spanish missionaries spotted the Gaddangs, they were forming long lines and carrying water-filled bamboo poles on their shoulders. When the friars asked about the bamboo water jugs, the carriers answered in unison with "Bayongyong." It was in 1739 when Spanish Augustinian Friars named the place "Bayumbung", which was later changed into Bayombong.

History

Bayombong was founded in the southeastern portion of the current barangays of La Torre North and South, where the Magat River flows. 

Prior to Spanish colonization, the town was inhabited by the Ifugaos and in 1718 they were followed by the Gaddangs from Daruyat, Angadanan, Isabela and Amanga, Cagayan and the Maalats from Isabela. The Ifugaos were driven away by the Gaddangs to their new settlement in the province of Ifugao. The Gaddangs never greeted the Maalats upon their arrival. The Maalats' withdrawal to surrounding territories as a result of this resistance led to the first tribal conflict. They abandoned the land as they fled, which resulted in many abandoned bamboo stalks all over the area. Since then, the area has been known as "Bayumbung," serving as a memorial to the Gaddangs' first triumph over an invasion of their own territory. 

Bayombong was formally founded on April 12, 1739, during the first Catholic mass celebrated in the region, officiated by Father Pedro Freire in a makeshift chapel at the foot of the Bangan Hill.

Bayombong came under the administration of Dominican friars as a part of the Paniqui mission pueblo a few months after its founding. The pueblo census of 1747 records 470 residents of Bayombong. The names of those considered to be founding fathers of Bayombong were Ramon Cabauatan, Jacinto Gadingan, Vicente Saquing, Ignacio Abuag, Mariano Danao, Domingo Bayaua, a certain Bincatan and a certain Mamuric. All of them were Gaddangs. Their names are remembered today in major streets of the town.

In 1754, the local government was formally organized. A Capitan del Pueblo was appointed as the chief executive. In 1982, the town became the seat of the new Diocese of Bayombong.

From 1773 to 1792, Fray Juan Crespo constructed the brick St. Dominic's church, the convent, and the cemetery next to the church, and started the octagonal tower. By 1829, Fray Juan Molano finished the tower. In 1880 the church building was damaged in an earthquake, while more than a century later, in 1987, a fire destroyed the church and convent. In 1989, the 250th anniversary of the first Catholic mass in Bayombong, the rebuilt cathedral was dedicated.

On November 28, 1899, during the Philippine–American War, General Fernando Canon surrendered his 300-man battalion, plus 139 Spanish and 14 American prisoners, to 2nd Lt. James N. Munro's 53 men of the 4th Cavalry. Included in the release were William Rynders and Orrison Woodbury, captured with the rest of Lt. Gillmore's men during the Siege of Baler.

In 1916, the American administration started a farm settlement school in Bayombong. In 1918, a high-school curriculum was added, and the school was named Bayombong Rural School. In 1928, Father de Gryse started St. Mary's, a Catholic elementary school. In 1930, Bayombong Rural School was re-purposed as Nueva Vizcaya Rural High School (NVRHS), and in 1934 St. Mary's added a high-school department. During the Japanese occupation, high school operations were suspended; they resumed in 1945. In 1947, the St. Mary's College (now St. Mary's University) was established by the CICM near the elementary and high-schools of the same name. In 1956, NVRHS was converted into two programs: Nueva Vizcaya General Comprehensive High School and Nueva Vizcaya National Agricultural School. In 1964 the agricultural school became Nueva Vizcaya Agricultural College, then in 1973 became the Nueva Vizcaya State Institute of Technology. Presently, the school is the Nueva Vizcaya State University.

Bayombong is the 1913 birthplace of Roy Anthony Cutaran Bennett (1913–1990), editor of the Manila Bulletin who was tortured for his outspoken opposition to the Japanese occupation of the Philippines. Edith Lopez Tiempo, another Bayombong native, was celebrated as a National Artist of the Philippines in 1999.

Geography
The terrain is mountainous dominated by steep hills and mountains encompassing an area of 36.44% of its total land area. The percentage which is level to gently sloping consists of 32.03% of the total area, rolling to hilly consists of 8.09%, while the remaining 23.44% consists of very steep mountains.  The town was founded at the juncture of the Calocool and Magat Rivers, and has grown to incorporate the Pan-Philippine Highway.

Barangays
Bayombong is politically subdivided into 25 barangays. These barangays are headed by elected officials: Barangay Captain, Barangay Council, whose members are called Barangay Councilors. All are elected every three years.

Climate

Demographics

Language
Ilocano, Bontoc, Gaddang, Ifugao, Isinay, Tagalog, and English are used always in Bayombong's schools, markets, and places of worship but in public schools they also use Ilocano.

Economy

Tourism

 Capitol Park – It is considered the "Luneta of the North". This 8-hectare park is carpeted with green grass and elegantly landscaped. It has a boating lagoon, fountain and wishing well, picnic huts, and sports facilities. It also has painting murals depicting some significant legends, the indigenous tribes, and major attractions of the province.
 Bayombong Children's Park – located at the heart of the town and is a good playground for children. It is equipped with swings, slides, etc.
 St. Dominic Cathedral – It is located at the heart of the town and boasts of having the best-sounding church bells in the country. The structure is made of bricks and rare church antiques.
 The People's Museum and Library – This two-story historical building, where the provincial government was formerly seated, is now housing the Novo Vizcayano history and heritage.
 Bangan Hill National Park – A historic landmark and cultural treasure. It is the site of the annual "Stations of the Cross" staged by the local Catholic church during the Lenten season using live actors depicting the last moments leading to Jesus Christ's crucifixion. Also great for hiking enthusiasts.
 Rizal Shrine – located at Barangay Casat, Bayombong.
 Bansing or Ammococan Falls – Located at Barangay Bansing, Bayombong, Nueva Vizcaya.
 Magat River

Government

For 14 years from its founding in 1739, the town of Bayombong was administered by Friars. The major activities of the colonizers were religion and education.

The year 1574 marked the beginning of the formal organization of the local government of Bayombong. With the appointment of a Capitan del Pueblo as the town's chief executive. In 1789, the title of the chief executive was changed to Gobernadorcillo. In 1893, the title was changed to Capitan Municipal. During the government in 1896, the Presidente Local was chief executive of the town but this was again changed to Mayor in 1937 as per provision of the Commonwealth Constitution.

Bayombong, belonging to the lone congressional district of the province of Nueva Vizcaya, is governed by a mayor designated as its local chief executive and by a municipal council as its legislative body in accordance with the Local Government Code. The mayor, vice mayor, and the councilors are elected directly by the people through an election which is being held every three years.

Elected officials

Education
The Schools Division of Nueva Vizcaya governs the town's public education system. The division office is a field office of the DepEd in Cagayan Valley region. The office governs the public and private elementary and public and private high schools throughout the municipality.

Colleges and universities
 Nueva Vizcaya State University
 PLT College Inc.
 Saint Mary's University
 Sierra College

Technical schools
 Northern Luzon Technical Institute 
 Vizcaya Institute of Computer Science 
 First Gateway Scholastic College
 Vizcaya Prime Care
 Balasi-Secretario Training Center

High schools and senior high schools
 Nueva Vizcaya General Comprehensive High School
 Philippine Science High School — Cagayan Valley Campus
 Saint Mary's University High School / Science High School
 Nueva Vizcaya State University, Laboratory School
 Muir Woods Academy formerly known as Nueva Vizcaya Bright Child School, Inc.
 Bonfal National High School
 Casat National High School
Paima National High School

Elementary schools

Private preschools
 Saint Mary's University Kindergarten
 United Methodist Christian School
 Muir Woods Academy formerly known as Nueva Vizcaya Bright Child School, Inc.
 Kingsway Christian Academy
 Bayfields School
 Salvacion Daycare Center
 Nueva Vizcaya State University Kidcare Learning Center
 PLT Preschool Department
 Casat Day Care Center

Playhouse and tutorial services
 Holy Infant Childcare and Playhouse

Media
GMA Network Channel 7 (Bayombong) via (Dagupan)
ABS-CBN Channel 2 (Bayombong) via (Isabela)

Sister cities
 Gonohe, Aomori, Japan

References

External links

 [ Philippine Standard Geographic Code]
 Philippine Census Information
 Local Governance Performance Management System

Municipalities of Nueva Vizcaya
Provincial capitals of the Philippines